Netzer may refer to:

 Netzer Olami, a worldwide Jewish organization for youth.
 Amnon Netzer, Iranian-Israeli historian
 Călin Peter Netzer, Romanian film director
 Ehud Netzer, Israeli archaeologist
 Erika Netzer (1937–1977), Austrian alpine skier
 Günter Netzer, (born 1944), a former German football player and manager
 Joseph Netzer, former mayor of Arlon in Belgium
 Josef Netzer (1808-1864), Austrian composer
 Michael Netzer, (born 1955), American comics artist
 Patrick Netzer, Swiss curler